Cerkljanska Dobrava is a small settlement in the Municipality of Cerklje na Gorenjskem in the Upper Carniola region of Slovenia.

Name
The name of the settlement was changed from Dobrava to Cerkljanska Dobrava in 1952. In the past the German name was Dobrawa bei Zirklach.

See also 
Dobrava (toponym)

References

External links 

Cerkljanska Dobrava on Geopedia

Populated places in the Municipality of Cerklje na Gorenjskem